Giuseppe Michielli (born 23 May 1985) is an Italian Nordic combined skier who has competed since 2002. Competing in two Winter Olympics, he earned his best finish of tenth in the 4 x 5 km team event at Vancouver in 2010 while earning his best finish of 14th in the 15 km individual event at Turin four years earlier.

Biography
Michielli's best finish at the FIS Nordic World Ski Championships was seventh in the 4 x 5 km team event at Liberec in 2009 while his best individual finish was 28th in the 10 km individual normal hill event at those same championships.

His best World Cup finish was ninth in a 4 x 5 km team event in Italy in 2005 while his best individual finish was tenth in a 10 km individual normal hill event in Germany in 2010.

Further notable results
 2004: 3rd, Italian championships of Nordic combined skiing
 2005:
 2nd, Italian championships of Nordic combined skiing
 2nd, Italian championships of Nordic combined skiing, sprint
 2006:
 1st, Italian championships of Nordic combined skiing, sprint
 2nd, Italian championships of Nordic combined skiing
 2007:
 1st, Italian championships of Nordic combined skiing
 1st, Italian championships of Nordic combined skiing, sprint
 2008: 3rd, Italian championships of Nordic combined skiing, sprint
 2010: 2nd, Italian championships of Nordic combined skiing
 2011: 2nd, Italian championships of Nordic combined skiing

References

1985 births
Italian male Nordic combined skiers
Living people
Nordic combined skiers at the 2006 Winter Olympics
Nordic combined skiers at the 2010 Winter Olympics
Nordic combined skiers at the 2014 Winter Olympics
Olympic Nordic combined skiers of Italy
People from Gemona del Friuli
Nordic combined skiers of Fiamme Oro
Sportspeople from Friuli-Venezia Giulia